Boliscus decipiens is a species of spiders of the genus Boliscus. It is endemic to Sri Lanka.

See also
 List of Thomisidae species

References

Spiders described in 1899
Thomisidae
Endemic fauna of Sri Lanka
Spiders of Asia